Micromonospora fiedleri is a Gram-positive bacterium from the genus Micromonospora which has been isolated from sediments from Norway.

References

External links
Type strain of Verrucosispora fiedleri at BacDive -  the Bacterial Diversity Metadatabase	

Micromonosporaceae
Bacteria described in 2013